"Going Missing" was the fourth single released from Maxïmo Park, taken from their debut album A Certain Trigger. It was released on 18 July 2005 and reached number 20 on the UK Singles Chart. The song was featured during the end credits of the movie Stranger than Fiction.

Track listing
 CD1 (WAP190CD)(White Cover) :
 "Going Missing" – 3:43
 "A19" – 2:18

 CD2 (WAP190CDR)(Blue Cover) :
 "Going Missing" (Acoustic) – 3:58
 "A Year of Doubt" – 2:01
 "Kiss You Better" (Acoustic) – 2:04

 7" (7WAP190, one-sided etched vinyl):
 "Going Missing" – 3:43
 "Going Missing" (Acoustic) – 3:58

References

External links
 Single information on MaxïmoPark.com
 Video of 'Going Missing'

2005 singles
Maxïmo Park songs
Songs written by Paul Smith (rock vocalist)
Song recordings produced by Paul Epworth
2005 songs
Songs written by Duncan Lloyd
Warp (record label) singles